HMS Majestic was the second ship to bear the name. She was an 80-gun second rate ship of the line, built at Chatham Dockyard and launched on 1 December 1853. She spent 12 years on the stocks beforehand. She was fitted with both sail and screw propulsion. She served in the Crimean War, and acted as part of Liverpool's harbour defences from 1860–66, during which time she was noted for blocking two ships commissioned by the American Confederacy from leaving Laird's Shipyard in Birkenhead.  She was eventually broken up in 1868 after 15 years in service.

References

Ships of the line of the Royal Navy
1853 ships
Crimean War naval ships of the United Kingdom
Ships built in Chatham